Chitthamoor Vijayaraghavalu Sridhar (22 July 1933 – 20 October 2008) was an Indian screenwriter and film director. He has directed nearly 60 films in Tamil, Hindi and Telugu Languages.

Career

Entry
In 1951, 18-year-old Sridhar went to AVM Productions with his story Latchiyavathi but P. Neelakantan rejected his story. Avvai T. K. Shanmugam was very much impressed by the story and Sridhar wrote the screenplay and dialogues for the drama. It was staged as Raththa Paasam and was one of the most successful dramas staged by TKS brothers. Sridhar was proudly taken to the stage and introduced to the audience as the writer. It was later produced jointly by TKS and Jupiter pictures under Jupiter – Avvai Productions where Jupiter pictures recommended some other writer to write the dialogues for the film. It was T. K. Shanmugam who was staunch that Sridhar should write the screenplay and dialogues. Sridhar made his entry into films as a screenwriter in Ratha Paasam. Later AVM Productions produced it in Hindi as Bhaai Bhaai  in 1956 starring Ashok Kumar and Kishore Kumar but direction was by R. S. Mani.  The film Bhai Bhai gave a big commercial break for the music director Madan Mohan
and the writer Sridhar himself.

Sridhar wrote story and dialogues for Edhir Paradhathu. Sridhar wrote the dialogues in Tamil for the Telugu movie Parivartana and the movie was dubbed in 1955 as Latchadhipathi. Sridhar continued on writing for films like Maaman Magal, Maheswari, Amara Deepam, Maadharkula Manikkam, Engal Veetu Mahalakshmi, Yaar Paiyan, Manjal Mahimai, Uthama Puthiran and Punar Jenmam.

While working in Modern Theatres as writer for the film Maheswari, Sridhar had an opportunity to improve his knowledge and skills about film production. T. R. Sundaram had a huge library of international books about great films and directors, about film production, critical and technical essays.  Sridhar had a very high esteem on the legendary director V. Shantaram.

Venus Pictures
In 1956, Sridhar turned producer along with associates Krishnamoorthi, Govindarajan and Sundararajan in Venus Pictures where he scripted Amara Deepam and followed by Uthama Puthiran. Both films had Sivaji Ganesan and Padmini as the main roles. He made his debut as a director with Kalyana Parisu. This movie ran for more than 25 weeks, and is revered to this day as a milestone in the history of Tamil cinema. After this, he had a huge fan following and his name was talked about among the middle class movie going audience.

Chitralaya
He started his own production company Chitralaya (the emblem was designed by Art director Ganga) in 1961 with his friends Gopu, A. Vincent, P. N. Sundaram and Tiruchi Arunachalam made Then Nilavu. The latter which had Gemini Ganesan and Vyjayanthimala in the lead was the first Tamil film to be shot in Jammu and Kashmir. He made a series of commercially successful films like Nenjil Or Aalayam, Kaadhalikka Neramillai, Vennira Adai and many more.

Film-making style

Sridhar was known as Nava-rasa-director, as he made films in a variety of styles, from the comedy Kaadhalikka Neramillai to the serious Kalai-kovil and Nenjil Or Aalayam. The latter was remade in Hindi with Rajendra Kumar and Meena Kumari as Dil Ek Mandir which earn him two nomination at Filmfare Awards, Best Director and Best Story categories. He brought out the best in comedians T. R. Ramachandran, K. A. Thangavelu, and Nagesh, and helped introduce Murthy and Nirmala to a wider audience in Vennira Aadai. Moorthy, Nirmala, now a TV and movie comedian, is still referred to as Vennira Aadai Moorthy after the fame he received from his performance in the movie. Even the actresses Jayalalitha and Nirmala used to be referred to as Vennira AadaiJayalalitha and Vennira Aadai Nirmala

Sridhar's Kaadhalikka Neramillai was one of the greatest blockbusters of Tamil film history.  It was later remade in Hindi with actor Kishore Kumar and Shashi Kapoor by himself. Sridhar helped launch the career of many celebrities in Tamil cinema, namely, Saroja Devi in Kalyaana Parisu, R. Muthuraman and Devika in Nenjil Or Aalayam, Srikanth, J. Jayalalithaa, Vennira Aadai Nirmala and Vennira Aadai Moorthy in Vennira Adai (White Dress), Ravichandran, Kanchana and Rajasree in Kaadhalikka Neramillai, Kamal and Rajini in Ilamai Oonjal Aadigirathu, Karthik and Gigi in Ninaivellaam Nithya, Jayashree in Thendralae Ennai Thodu and Vikram in Thanthu Vitten Ennai.

His Bollywood films include Nazrana (1961), Dil Ek Mandir (1963), Pyar Kiye Jaa (1966) and Gehri Chaal (1973). Nazrana, starring by Raj Kapoor, Vyjayanthimala, Usha Kiran and Gemini Ganesan in guest appearance, earned him Filmfare Award for Best Story.The landmark film Nai Roshni directed by him in Hindi had Ashok Kumar, P. Bhanumati, Mala Sinha, Biwajeet and Raajkumar in lead roles and became the 7th highest-grossing film of the year 1967 in Hindi. Subsequently, this film was remade in Tamil as Poovum Pottum directed by Dada Mirasi.

Sridhar's films with Sivaji Ganesan include Ooty Varai Uravu, Nenjirukkum Varai, Sivantha Mann. Sivanthaman was the first color movie in Tamil shot at foreign locations. Dharti, the Hindi version was released in 1970 with Rajendra Kumar, Waheeda Rehman and Sivaji Ganesan in lead roles.

When in 1973, he went through sudden financial problems, at the insistence of Rajendra Kumar he approached M. G. Ramachandran, who suggested that a film be made and using that his financial woes would get resolved. Sridhar then made Urimai Kural which was a commercial success in 1974 and went on to direct M.G.R again in Meenava Nanban that was released in 1977.

In 1978, he brought together Kamal Hasan, Rajnikanth, Sripriya for romantic film Illamai Oonjal Aadugirathu. Then he remade the same in 1982 in Hindi as Dil-E-Nadan starring Rajesh Khanna, Shatrughan Sinha and Jaya Prada in lead roles. Both versions were successful.

In all his films he used a combination of stars, melodrama and melodious songs. He has directed films in Tamil, Hindi and Telugu. Sridhar was considered an expert in song picturisation as he could transform any song into sheer poetry. The formidable Sridhar – Kannadasan – M. S. Viswanathan combination held a magic spell on the audience and the songs contributed to the tremendous success of those films. Later on he switched to the Maestro Ilayaraaja for music and all his films with Ilayaraaja's music were known for their songs.

Death
Sridhar died of Cardiac arrest in Chennai on 20 October 2008, aged 75.

Filmography

Awards
Won
 1959: Certificate of Merit for Best Feature Film in Tamil – Kalyana Parisu
 1962: President's Silver Medal for Best Feature Film in Tamil – Nenjil Or Aalayam
 Kalaimamani Award from State Sangeeth Natak Academy.
 Filmfare Award for Best Story for Nazrana (1961).
Tamil Nadu State Film Honorary Award – Arignar Anna Award in 1997

Nominated
 Filmfare Award for Best Director for Dil Ek Mandir (1963)
 Filmfare Award for Best Story for Dil Ek Mandir (1963)
 Filmfare Award for Best Director - Tamil for Urimai Kural (1975)
 Filmfare Award for Best Director - Tamil for Ilamai Oonjal Aadukirathu (1979)
 Filmfare Award for Best Director - Tamil for Oru Odai Nadhiyagirathu (1984)

References

External links

C. V. Sridhar's Sterling Face of Romance

2008 deaths
Film directors from Tamil Nadu
Tamil film directors
1933 births
Filmfare Awards winners
People from Kanchipuram district
20th-century Indian film directors
Telugu film directors
Telugu screenwriters
Screenwriters from Tamil Nadu
20th-century Indian dramatists and playwrights
20th-century Indian screenwriters